Rainwater harvesting (RWH) is the collection and storage of rain, rather than allowing it to run off. Rainwater is collected from a roof-like surface and redirected to a tank, cistern, deep pit (well, shaft, or borehole), aquifer, or a reservoir with percolation, so that it seeps down and restores the ground water. Dew and fog can also be collected with nets or other tools. Rainwater harvesting differs from stormwater harvesting as the runoff is typically collected from roofs and other surfaces for storage and subsequent reuse. Its uses include watering gardens, livestock, irrigation, domestic use with proper treatment, and domestic heating. The harvested water can also be committed to longer-term storage or groundwater recharge.

Rainwater harvesting is one of the simplest and oldest methods of self-supply of water for households, having been used in South Asia and other countries for many thousands of years. Installations can be designed for different scales including households, neighbourhoods and communities and can also be designed to serve institutions such as schools, hospitals and other public facilities

Applications

Domestic use 
Rooftop rainwater harvesting is used to provide drinking water, domestic water, water for livestock, water for small irrigation, and a way to replenish groundwater levels.

Agriculture 
In regards to urban agriculture, rainwater harvesting in urban areas reduces the impact of runoff and flooding. The combination of urban ‘green’ rooftops with rainwater catchments have been found to reduce building temperatures by more than 1.3 degrees Celsius. Rainwater harvesting in conjunction with urban agriculture would be a viable way to help meet the United Nations Sustainable Development Goals for cleaner and sustainable cities, health and wellbeing, and food and water security (Sustainable Development Goal 6). The technology is available, however, it needs to be remodeled in order to use water more efficiently, especially in an urban setting.

Kenya has already been successfully harvesting rainwater for toilets, laundry, and irrigation. Since the establishment of the country's 2016 Water Act, Kenya has prioritized the regulation of their agriculture industry. Additionally, areas in Australia use harvested rainwater for cooking and drinking. Studies done by Stout et al researching the feasibility in India found RWH was most beneficial used for small-scale irrigation, which provides income with the sales of produce, and overflow used for groundwater recharge.

Missions to five Caribbean countries have shown that the capture and storage of rainwater runoff for later use is able to significantly reduce the risk of losing some or all of the year's harvest because of soil or water scarcity. In addition, the risks associated with flooding and soil erosion during high rainfall seasons would decrease. Small farmers, especially those farming on hillsides, could benefit the most from rainwater harvesting because they are able to capture runoff and decrease the effects of soil erosion.

Many countries, especially those with arid environments, use rainwater harvesting as a cheap and reliable source of clean water. To enhance irrigation in arid environments, ridges of soil are constructed to trap and prevent rainwater from running down hills and slopes. Even in periods of low rainfall, enough water is collected for crops to grow. Water can be collected from roofs, dams and ponds can be constructed to hold large quantities of rainwater so that even on days when little to no rainfall occurs, enough is available to irrigate crops.

Industry 

Frankfurt Airport has the biggest rainwater harvesting system in Germany. The system helps save approximately 1 million cubic meters of water per year. The cost of the system was 1.5 million dm (US$63,000) in 1993. This system collects water from the roofs of the new terminal which has an area of 26,800 square meters. The water is collected in the basement of the airport in six tanks with a storage capacity of 100 cubic meters. The water is mainly used for toilet flushing, watering plants and cleaning the air conditioning system.

Rainwater harvesting was adopted at The Velodrome – The London Olympic Park – in order to increase the sustainability of the facility. A 73% decrease in potable water demand by the park was estimated. Despite this, it was deemed that rainwater harvesting was a less efficient use of financial resources to increase sustainability than the park's blackwater recycling program.

Technologies 
Traditionally, stormwater management using detention basins served a single purpose. However, optimized real-time control lets this infrastructure double as a source of rainwater harvesting without compromising the existing detention capacity. This has been used in the EPA headquarters to evacuate stored water prior to storm events, thus reducing wet weather flow while ensuring water availability for later reuse. This has the benefit of increasing water quality released and decreasing the volume of water released during combined sewer overflow events.

Generally, check dams are constructed across the streams to enhance the percolation of surface water into the subsoil strata. The water percolation in the water-impounded area of the check dams can be enhanced artificially manyfold by loosening the subsoil strata and overburden using ANFO explosives as used in open cast mining. Thus, local aquifers can be recharged quickly using the available surface water fully for use in the dry season.

System setup 
Rainwater harvesting systems can range in complexity, from systems that can be installed with minimal skills, to automated systems that require advanced setup and installation. The basic rainwater harvesting system is more of a plumbing job than a technical job, as all the outlets from the building's terrace are connected through a pipe to an underground tank that stores water. There are common components that are installed in such systems, such as pre-filters (see e.g. vortex filter), drains/gutters, storage containers, and depending on whether the system is pressurized, also pumps, and treatment devices such as UV lights, chlorination devices and post-filtration equipment.

Systems are ideally sized to meet the water demand throughout the dry season since it must be big enough to support daily water consumption. Specifically, the rainfall capturing area such as a building roof must be large enough to maintain an adequate flow of water. The water storage tank size should be large enough to contain the captured water. 
For low-tech systems, many low-tech methods are used to capture rainwater: rooftop systems, surface water capture, and pumping the rainwater that has already soaked into the ground or captured in reservoirs and storing it in tanks (cisterns).

Rainwater harvesting by freshwater-flooded forests 
Rainwater harvesting is possible by growing freshwater-flooded forests without losing the income from the used, submerged land. The main purpose of the rainwater harvesting is to use the locally available rainwater to meet water requirements throughout the year without the need of huge capital expenditure. This would facilitate the availability of uncontaminated water for domestic, industrial, and irrigation needs.

Rainwater harvesting by solar power panels 
Good quality water resource, closer to populated areas, is becoming scarce and costly for the consumers. In addition to solar and wind energy, rainwater is major renewable resource of any land. The vast area is being covered by solar PV panels every year in all parts of the world. Solar panels can also be used for harvesting most of the rainwater falling on them and drinking quality water, free from bacteria and suspended matter, can be generated by simple filtration and disinfection processes as rainwater is very low in salinity. Exploitation of rainwater for value-added products like bottled drinking water, makes solar PV power plants profitable even in high rainfall/ cloudy areas by the augmented income from value-added drinking water generation. Recently cost-effective rainwater collection in the already dug wells found to be highly effective in bringing groundwater level up in India.

Other innovations 

Instead of using the roof for catchment, the RainSaucer, which looks like an upside-down umbrella, collects rain straight from the sky. This decreases the potential for contamination and makes RainSaucer a potential application for potable water in developing countries. Other applications of this free-standing rainwater collection approach are sustainable gardening and small-plot farming.

A Dutch invention called the Groasis Waterboxx is also useful for growing trees with harvested and stored dew and rainwater.

Advantages 
Rainwater harvesting provides the independent water supply during regional water restrictions, and in developed countries, it is often used to supplement the main supply. It provides water when a drought occurs, can help mitigate flooding of low-lying areas, and reduces demand on wells which may enable groundwater levels to be sustained. Rainwater harvesting increases the availability of water during dry seasons by increasing the levels of dried borewells and wells. Surface water supply is readily available for various purposes thus reducing dependence on underground water. It improves the quality of ground by diluting salinity. It does not cause pollution and is environmentally friendly. It is cost-effective and easily affordable. It also helps in the availability of potable water, as rainwater is substantially free of salinity and other salts. Applications of rainwater harvesting in urban water system provides a substantial benefit for both water supply and wastewater subsystems by reducing the need for clean water in water distribution systems, less generated stormwater in sewer systems, and a reduction in stormwater runoff polluting freshwater bodies.

A large body of work has focused on the development of life cycle assessment and its costing methodologies to assess the level of environmental impacts and money that can be saved by implementing rainwater harvesting systems.

Independent water supply 
Rainwater harvesting provides an independent water supply during water restrictions. In areas where clean water is costly, or difficult to come by, rainwater harvesting is a critical source of clean water. In developed countries, rainwater is often harvested to be used as a supplemental source of water rather than the main source, but the harvesting of rainwater can also decrease a household's water costs or overall usage levels. Rainwater is safe to drink if the consumers do additional treatments before drinking. Boiling water helps to kill germs. Adding another supplement to the system such as a first flush diverter is also a common procedure to avoid contaminants of the water.

Supplemental in drought 
When drought occurs, rainwater harvested in past months can be used. If rain is scarce but also unpredictable, the use of a rainwater harvesting system can be critical to capturing the rain when it does fall. Many countries with arid environments, use rainwater harvesting as a cheap and reliable source of clean water. To enhance irrigation in arid environments, ridges of soil are constructed to trap and prevent rainwater from running downhills. Even in periods of low rainfall, enough water is collected for crops to grow. Water can be collected from roofs and tanks can be constructed to hold large quantities of rainwater.

In addition, rainwater harvesting decreases the demand for water from wells, enabling groundwater levels to be further sustained rather than depleted.

Life-cycle assessment 
Life-cycle assessment is a methodology used to evaluate the environmental impacts of a system from cradle-to-grave of its lifetime. Devkota et al, developed such a methodology for rainwater harvesting, and found that the building design (e.g., dimensions) and function (e.g., educational, residential, etc.) play critical roles in the environmental performance of the system. 

To address the functional parameters of rainwater harvesting systems, a new metric was developed – the demand to supply ratio (D/S) – identifying the ideal building design (supply) and function (demand) in regard to the environmental performance of rainwater harvesting for toilet flushing. With the idea that supply of rainwater not only saves the potable water but also saves the stormwater entering the combined sewer network (thereby requiring treatment), the savings in environmental emissions were higher if the buildings are connected to a combined sewer network compared to separate one.

Cost-effectiveness 
Although standard RWH systems can provide a water source to developing regions facing poverty, the average cost for an RWH setup can be costly depending on the type of technology used. Governmental aid and NGOs can assist communities facing poverty by providing the materials and education necessary to develop and maintain RWH setups.

Some studies show that rainwater harvesting is a widely applicable solution for water scarcity and other multiple usages, owing to its cost-effectiveness and eco-friendliness. Constructing new substantial, centralized water supply systems, such as dams, is prone to damage local ecosystems, generates external social costs, and has limited usages, especially in developing countries or impoverished communities. On the other hand, installing rainwater harvesting systems is verified by a number of studies to provide local communities a sustainable water source, accompanied by other various benefits, including protection from flood and control of water runoff, even in poor regions. Rainwater harvesting systems that do not require major construction or periodic maintenance by a professional from outside the community are more friendly to the environment and more likely to benefit the local people for a longer period of time. Thus, rainwater harvesting systems that could be installed and maintained by local people have bigger chances to be accepted and used by more people.

The usage of in-situ technologies can reduce investment costs in rainwater harvesting. In-situ technologies for rainwater harvesting could be a feasible option for rural areas since less material is required to construct them. They can provide a reliable water source that can be utilized to expand agricultural outputs. Above-ground tanks can collect water for domestic use; however, such units can be unaffordable to people in poverty.

Limitations 

Rainwater harvesting is a widely used method of storing rainwater in the countries presenting with drought characteristics. Several pieces of research have derived and developed different criteria and techniques to select suitable sites for harvesting rainwater. Some research was identified and selected suitable sites for the potential erection of dams, as well as derived a model builder in ArcMap 10.4.1. The model combined several parameters, such as slope, runoff potential, land cover/use, stream order, soil quality, and hydrology to determine the suitability of the site for harvesting rainwater.

Harvested water from RWH systems can be minimal during below-average precipitation in arid urban regions such as the Middle East. RWH is useful for developing areas as it collects water for irrigation and domestic purposes. However, the gathered water should be adequately filtered to ensure safe drinking.

Quality of water 
Rainwater may need to be analyzed properly, and used in a way appropriate to its safety. In the Gansu province, for example, solar water disinfection is used by boiling harvested rainwater in parabolic solar cookers before being used for drinking. These so-called "appropriate technology" methods provide low-cost disinfection options for treatment of stored rainwater for drinking.

While rainwater itself is a clean source of water, often better than groundwater or water from rivers or lakes, the process of collection and storage often leaves the water polluted and non-potable. Rainwater harvested from roofs can contain human, animal and bird feces, mosses and lichens, windblown dust, particulates from urban pollution, pesticides, and inorganic ions from the sea (Ca, Mg, Na, K, Cl, SO4), and dissolved gases (CO2, NOx, SOx). High levels of pesticide have been found in rainwater in Europe with the highest concentrations occurring in the first rain immediately after a dry spell; the concentration of these and other contaminants are reduced significantly by diverting the initial flow of run-off water to waste. Improved water quality can also be obtained by using a floating draw-off mechanism (rather than from the base of the tank) and by using a series of tanks, withdraw from the last in series. Prefiltration is a common practice used in the industry to keep the system healthy and ensure that the water entering the tank is free of large sediments.

A concept of rainwater harvesting and cleaning it with solar energy for rural household drinking purposes has been developed by Nimbkar Agricultural Research Institute.

Conceptually, a water supply system should match the quality of water with the end-user. However, in most of the developed world, high-quality potable water is used for all end uses. This approach wastes money and energy and imposes unnecessary impacts on the environment. Supplying rainwater that has gone through preliminary filtration measures for non-potable water uses, such as toilet flushing, irrigation, and laundry, may be a significant part of a sustainable water management strategy.

Rainwater cisterns can also act as habitat for pathogen-bearing mosquitoes. As a result, care must be taken to ensure that female mosquitoes can not access the cistern to lay eggs. Larvae eating fish can also be added to the cistern, or it can be chemically treated.

Research 
The South African Water Research Commission has supported research into rainwater harvesting. Studies in arid, semiarid, and humid regions have confirmed that techniques such as mulching, pitting, ridging, and modified run-on plots are effective for small-scale crop production. Hydrofracturing has regularly been used to improve the performance of water boreholes. From 1990 to 1992, 170 boreholes had been hydrofractured.

Country examples

Canada

India

United Kingdom

United States

Other countries 

 Uganda: Rainwater harvesting has been used in Uganda to promote household and community scale water security for many years. Regular maintenance is an ongoing challenge with existing installation and there are many examples of installations that have failed due to poor maintenance. Research has also shown that awareness of RWH and how to access necessary resources to implement RWH is variable across Ugandan society.
 Thailand has the largest fraction of the population in the rural area relying on rainwater harvesting (currently around 40%). Rainwater harvesting was promoted heavily by the government in the 1980s. In the 1990s, after government funding for the collection tanks ran out, the private sector stepped in and provided several million tanks to private households, many of which continue to be used. This is one of the largest examples of self-supply of water worldwide.
In Bermuda, the law requires all new construction to include rainwater harvesting adequate for the residents.
New Zealand has plentiful rainfall in the West and South, and rainwater harvesting is the normal practice in many rural areas, using roof water directed by spouting into covered, 1000 litre storage tanks, with the encouragement of most local councils.
 In Sri Lanka, rainwater harvesting has been a popular method of obtaining water for agriculture and for drinking purposes in rural homes. The legislation to promote rainwater harvesting was enacted through the Urban Development Authority (Amendment) Act, No. 36 of 2007. The Lanka Rainwater Harvesting Forum is leading Sri Lanka's initiative. See also: Tank cascade system.

History 

The construction and use of cisterns to store rainwater can be traced back to the Neolithic Age, when waterproof lime plaster cisterns were built in the floors of houses in village locations of the Levant, a large area in Southwest Asia, south of the Taurus Mountains, bound by the Mediterranean Sea in the west, the Arabian Desert in the south, and Mesopotamia in the east. By the late 4000 BC, cisterns were essential elements of emerging water management techniques used in dry-land farming.

Many ancient cisterns have been discovered in some parts of Jerusalem and throughout what is today Israel/Palestine. It was carved out of a solid rock, lined with large stones, and sealed with clay to keep from leaking.

The Greek island of Crete is also known for its use of large cisterns for rainwater collection and storage during the Minoan period from 2,600 BC–1,100 BC. Four large cisterns have been discovered at Myrtos–Pyrgos, Archanes, and Zakroeach.

Around 300 BC, farming communities in Balochistan (now located in Pakistan, Afghanistan, and Iran), and Kutch, India, used rainwater harvesting for agriculture and many other uses. Rainwater harvesting was done by Chola kings as well. Rainwater from the Brihadeeswarar temple (located in Balaganapathy Nagar, Thanjavur, India) was collected in Shivaganga tank. During the later Chola period, the Vīrānam tank was built (1011 to 1037 AD) in the Cuddalore district of Tamil Nadu to store water for drinking and irrigation purposes.

Rainwater harvesting was also common in the Roman Empire. While Roman aqueducts are well-known, Roman cisterns were also commonly used and their construction expanded with the Empire. For example, in Pompeii, rooftop water storage was common before the construction of the aqueduct in the 1st century BC. This history continued with the Byzantine Empire; for example, the Basilica Cistern in Istanbul.

Though little-known, for centuries the town of Venice depended on rainwater harvesting. The lagoon which surrounds Venice is brackish water, which is not suitable for drinking. The ancient inhabitants of Venice established a system of rainwater collection which was based on man-made insulated collection wells. Water percolated down the specially designed stone flooring, and was filtered by a layer of sand, then collected at the bottom of the well. Later, as Venice acquired territories on the mainland, it started to import water by boat from local rivers, but the wells remained in use and were especially important in the time of war when access to the mainland water could be blocked by an enemy.

See also 

 
 
 Blue roof
 Desalination 
  
 
 Hydropower
  
 Rain power

References

External links 

 
Water supply
Water conservation
Irrigation
Appropriate technology
Hydrology and urban planning
Sustainable gardening
DIY culture